Twin Lakes is an unincorporated community and census-designated place (CDP) in Mono County, California, United States. It is located on the east side of the Sierra Nevada, encompassing the lakes of the same name and extending north down the outlet valley of Robinson Creek. The community of Mono Village is within the CDP. It was first listed as a CDP for the 2020 census, with a population of 45.

References 

Census-designated places in Mono County, California
Census-designated places in California